The British Tunnelling Society (BTS) is a professional association established in London, UK, in 1971 by tunnelling professionals, led by Sir Harold Harding. The BTS is a learned society of the Institution of Civil Engineers, its mission being to provide a forum for meetings and discussion on tunnel-related matters.

The BTS took part in the founding of the International Tunneling and Underground Space Association (ITA-AITES) in 1974 and represents the UK on its General Assembly. In 2016, the BTS had 800 members making it one of the largest. The current chairman of the BTS, Kate Cooksey, assumed the position in May 2020. She is also the first female chairman of the Society.

Activities
The BTS provides a forum for meetings and discussion on tunnel-related matters, the BTS also publishes industry guidelines and codes of practice; conducts training courses to advance the education of tunnelling professionals; promotes the recruitment of young people to the industry; acknowledges excellence in tunnelling; sponsors and supports industry conferences; and advises Government and the general public on the art and science of tunnelling. Additionally, the BTS supports the MSc in Tunnelling and Underground Space at The University of Warwick, by advising on the course structure and facilitating lecturers from industry for many modules.

The BTS organises monthly meeting and the BTS Conference & Exhibition and Harding Memorial Lecture every second year. Named after Sir Harding – the founder of the society.

Awards and prizes 
The BTS awards the James Clarke Medal and Harding Prize annually to recognise the achievements of both eminent and young tunnellers respectively.

Harding Prize
Named in honour of Sir Harold Harding, the Harding Prize is awarded annually. The entry to the award consists of an original paper relating to any aspect of tunnelling which the entrant considers to be of interest to others in the tunnelling industry and is open to those aged 33 or younger on 1 January of the same year. The papers are then reviewed by a group of BTS committee members and the writers of selected papers are invited to make an oral presentation to the April BTS meeting. The winner is decided by members of the BTS Committee.

The James Clark Medal
The James Clark Medal is named in honour of James Clark, who worked for Charles Brand and Sons on many well-known tunnels. In 1981 his widow, Madeline, bequeathed a sum of money to provide a medal to be awarded annually to a British Tunneller to perpetuate James' memory. The original criteria were: contemporary achievement in tunnelling; or innovation or responsibility for a large project. In the mid-1980s the medal was not awarded, and with Madeline's approval a third criterion was added: a major contribution to the tunnelling industry. The James Clark Medal is the highest honour awarded by The British Tunnelling Society and has been awarded to:

 2021 - Bob Ibell
 2020 - Helen Nattrass 
 2019 - Mike King
 2018 - David Donaldson
 2017 - Joseph Gallagher
 2016 - Alan Runacres
 2015 - Doug Allenby
 2014 - Peter Jaques
 2013 - Andy Sindall
 2012 - David Court
 2011 - Terry Mellors
 2010 - Martin Knights
 2009 - Donald Lamont MBE
 2008 - Jack Knight
 2007 - Tommy Talbot
 2006 - Alan Dyke
 2005 - Maurice Gooderham
 2004 - Rodney Craig
 2003 - James Buchanan
 2002 - Dennis Walder
 2001 - David C Wallis
 2000 - Denis S Lawrenson
 1999 - Colin N P Mackenzie
 1998 - Dr Myles O'Reilly
 1997 - Gerard Pakes
 1996 - Hugh Docherty
 1995 - Dick Watts
 1994 - John Bartlett OBE
 1994 - Sir Alan Muir Wood
 1993 - R Remington
 1992 - Oliver M Bevan
 1991 - Alastair J Biggart
 1991- John King
 1991 - Colin J Kirkland
 1990 - David Martin
 1989 - R J S McBean
 1988 - Gordon Ince
 1985/86/87 Not Awarded
 1984 - K H Moore
 1983 - David A Harries, A C Lyons
 1982 - J Sheridan
 1981 - E Whyte

Publications
Over the years, The BTS and its Working Groups have published, or collaborated with others to publish, numerous best practice and other guides. These publications include:

Traditional Timbering in Soft Ground Tunnelling : A Historical Review (2014)
Monitoring Underground Construction: A best practice guide (2011)
The Specification for Tunnelling ( 2010)
The Tunnel Lining Design Guide (2004)
The Closed-face tunnelling machines and ground stability report (2005)
Joint Code of Practice for Risk Management of Tunnel Works in the UK (2003)
Hand Arm Vibration Syndrome (HAVS) : A Guide to Good Practice (2006)
Occupational Exposure to Nitrogen Monoxide : Best Practice Guide (2008)
A Guide to the Work in Compressed Air Regulations (1996)
Guidance for good working practice in high pressure compressed air (2015) 
The BTS has also actively participated in the production or revision of a number of key standards for the tunnelling industry:

BS6164: Code of Practice for Health & Safety in Tunnelling 
BS EN 815: Safety of unshielded tunnel boring machines and rodless shaft boring machines for rock.
BS EN 12110: Tunnelling machines Air locks Safety requirements
BS EN 12111: Tunnelling machines Road headers, continuous miners and impact rippers Safety requirements.
BS EN 12336: Tunnelling machines Shield machines, thrust boring machines, auger boring machines, lining erection equipment Safety requirements.

Former BTS Chairmen
 Ivor Thomas (2018–2020)
 Mark Leggett (2016–2018)
 Roger Bridge (2014–2016)
 Damian McGirr (2012–2014)
 Robert Ibell (2010–2012)
 Paul Hoyland (2008–2010)
 Bill Grose (2006–2008)
 David Court (2004–2006)
 Anthony Umney (2002–2004)
 Peter South (2000–2002)
 David Wallis (1999–2000)
 Eric Snowdon (1997–1999)
 David Fawcett (1995–1997)
 Colin Mackenzie (1993–1995)
 Roy Jennion (1991–1993)
 Dr Terry Mellors (1989–1991)
 David Donaldson (1987–1989)
 Colin Kirkland (1985–1987)
 Steven Tough (1983–1985)
 Oliver Bevan (1981–1983)
 Douglas Parkes (1979–1981)
 John Bartlett (1977–1979)
 John King (1976–1977)
 Sir Alan Muir Wood (1975–1976)
 Douglas Parkes (1973–1974)
 Sir Alan Muir Wood (1972–1973)
 Sir Harold Harding (1971–1973)

National Tunnelling Day

The British Tunnelling Society (BTS) announced the UK's first National Tunnelling Day to take place on Thursday, 3 December 2015. The aim of the day is to generate interest in the great number of world class tunnelling projects currently being undertaken in the UK and to promote the industry (and its many professions) to young people and students of all ages. The day will be an annual event occurring on, or in proximity to, the Feast Day of St. Barbara, traditionally seen as the Patron Saint of Tunnellers in the UK.

References

External links 
 

1971 establishments in the United Kingdom
Institution of Civil Engineers
Organisations based in the City of Westminster
Organizations established in 1971
Professional associations based in the United Kingdom
Tunnelling organizations
Tunnels in the United Kingdom